Sue Burke (born 1955) is an American writer and translator. She has written the science fiction novel Semiosis (2018) and its sequel, Interference (2019). Semiosis attracted favorable attention and acclaim and appeared on numerous lists of the best books of 2018.

Awards
In 2017, Burke received the Alicia Gordon Award for Word Artistry in Translation from the American Translators Association for her English translation of an excerpt from Joseph de la Vega’s Confusión de confusiones, written in Spanish in 1688. The book, the first analysis of stock markets ever written, was a commission from Bolsas y Mercados Españoles for an institutional gift.

Personal life
Burke grew up in Milwaukee, Wisconsin and attended the University of Wisconsin. She moved with her husband, a trilingual businessman, to Madrid, Spain, in December 1999. She moved to Chicago in July 2016.

Bibliography

Novels
 Semiosis duology
 Semiosis (February 2018, Tor Books)
 Interference (October 2019, Tor Books)
 Standalone
 Immunity Index (May 2021, Tor Books)

Short fiction

Stories

Translations
 Amadis of Gaul Book I (January 2012, BurglarHouse Books) – translation from the Spanish of Amadís de Gaula (1508) by Garci Rodríguez de Montalvo
 
 Confusion of Confusions (December 2016, Comisión Nacional del Mercado de Valores) – translation from the Spanish of Confusión de Confusiones (1688) by Joseph de la Vega
 Amadis of Gaul Book II (September 2017, BurglarHouse Books) – translation from the Spanish of Amadís de Gaula (1508) by Garci Rodríguez de Montalvo
 Amadis of Gaul Book III (January 2018, BurglarHouse Books) – translation from the Spanish of Amadís de Gaula (1508) by Garci Rodríguez de Montalvo
 Canción Antigua – An Old Song: Anthology of Poems (April 2018) – with Christian Law, translation from the Spanish of poems by Vicente Núñez
 Amadis of Gaul Book IV (November 2018, BurglarHouse Books) – translation from the Spanish of Amadís de Gaula (1508) by Garci Rodríguez de Montalvo

References

External links
 Official website

1955 births
Living people
21st-century American novelists
21st-century American translators
21st-century American women writers
American science fiction writers
American women novelists
Asimov's Science Fiction people